The Firm is a legal thriller television series that began airing on January 8, 2012, on Global in Canada and NBC in the United States and in February 2012 on AXN, and is a sequel to the 1991 John Grisham novel of the same name and its 1993 film adaptation. The television adaptation is set ten years after the novel and film.

On February 3, 2012, NBC announced that the series would be pulled from its Thursday 10/9c slot immediately, and placed on Saturdays at 9/8c starting on February 18; Global continued to air the series at the former time slot until March 3, when the show was moved to Saturdays.  AXN began broadcasts in over 125 territories and countries on February 19.

On May 13, 2012, NBC canceled the series after one season.

Plot
The 2012 television show picks up on the story of Mitchell Y. McDeere and his family ten years after the fictional setting of the 1991 novel and 1993 film. In the original film and book, McDeere helped topple the Memphis law firm of Bendini, Lambert & Locke that protected a Chicago organized crime syndicate, resulting in mob convictions. When the Chicago mob boss dies in prison, the McDeeres emerge from witness protection to start their new life. The television adaptation attempts to remain true to the conspiracy element of its predecessors. Once McDeere is out of witness protection and building a new law firm, Kinross & Clark, a shady law firm, pushes to acquire McDeere's. Since the McDeeres are strapped for cash, he is tempted by the business prospects of the mysterious firm. Although McDeere's law firm is considered scrappy, he has become leery of being watched, which makes focusing on his job difficult. McDeere has a ten-year-old daughter Claire (Natasha Calis) and he begins the remaking of his career in the Washington Metropolitan Area.  Mitch's brother and his brother's girlfriend work for his upstart law firm, which works out of a tiny former travel agency office. The first season revolves around a conspiracy and Kinross & Clark's interest in a McDeere client accused of murder. Throughout the season, the deceased mob boss' son contemplates seeking revenge on Mitch who was a cause of his father's prison term.

Cast and characters
The following are the regular and recurring cast members in The Firm:
Regular
 Josh Lucas as Mitchell Y. "Mitch" McDeere, a Harvard-educated lawyer
 Molly Parker as Abigail Sutherland "Abby" McDeere, Mitch McDeere's blue-blood wife and an elementary teacher
 Callum Keith Rennie as Raymond "Ray" McDeere, Mitch McDeere's ex-con brother and investigator
 Juliette Lewis as Tamara Inez "Tammy" Hemphill  Ray McDeere's girlfriend and Mitch's secretary
 Natasha Calis as Claire McDeere, Mitch and Abby McDeere's daughter

Recurring
 Tricia Helfer as Alex Clark
 Martin Donovan as Kevin Stack
 Shaun Majumder as Andrew Palmer
 Paulino Nunes as U.S. Marshall Louis Coleman
 Edward Glen as Duty Captain

Production

Development
The concept of bringing these characters to television had been in the works for a few years with CBS having formerly been the expected network. Reiter conceived the recreation of the series 10 years into the future and proposed it to Grisham. Grisham oversaw the first three or four episode scripts and then became confident with its development.

Sony Pictures Television ordered 22 episodes of the show from Entertainment One Television in late April 2011 for broadcast on their AXN stations in 125 markets outside of Canada and the U.S. Shortly thereafter, NBC and Shaw Media confirmed that they had acquired broadcast rights in the U.S. and Canada respectively. The show's 22 episode order was the largest of any of NBC's newly picked up shows.

The show was filmed in Toronto and was produced by Entertainment One in association with Sony Pictures Television and Paramount Pictures. Filming of Season 1 took place between August 4, 2011 and April 30, 2012. The pilot was directed by David Straiton.

Grisham served as an executive producer of the television series. Lukas Reiter, a former Law & Order producer, wrote the pilot and was the showrunner. Some of the other legal shows he has produced are The Practice and Boston Legal.  Other executive producers were Entertainment One's John Morayniss, Michael Rosenberg, Noreen Halpern, and Helen Shaver. The show's writers included Alyson Feltes, Peter Noah, David Feige, William Rothko, Vincent Angell, and Jonathan Shapiro.

On June 8, 2011, it was announced that Josh Lucas had been cast in the lead role of Mitch McDeere. On July 12, Entertainment One announced the casting of Callum Keith Rennie as Ray McDeere and Juliette Lewis as Tammy. The addition of  Molly Parker as Abby McDeere was announced on July 29. Natasha Calis was cast as Claire McDeere, Mitch and Abby McDeere's daughter. Parker had previously played Calis' mother in the 2011 Lifetime film, Gone. Then, Tricia Helfer and Shaun Majumder were added in recurring roles as Alex Clarke and Andrew Palmer on August 19 and 22. , the show was under production.

On July 19, 2011, CBS filed a lawsuit against Reiter and Entertainment One "for tortious interference with contract, breach of contract, and breach of the implied covenant of good faith and fair dealing" because after CBS declined to commission a series from his script after paying him for it, Reiter reworked it, and Entertainment One agreed to produce it.

Background
Both the novel and the film recount the story of an upstart attorney who unknowingly was hired by an organized crime enterprise's legal team.  He became a whistleblower to the Federal Bureau of Investigation and brought down the corrupt Memphis law firm with Chicago mob ties. The TV series begins as the McDeere family emerge from witness protection to encounter old and new challenges. The novel sold seven million copies. The film starring Tom Cruise grossed over $158 million ($ million in  dollars) domestically and $111 million internationally ($270 million worldwide in 1993 dollars). It was the largest grossing R-rated movie of 1993 and of any film based on a Grisham novel. The week the film was released, Grisham and Michael Crichton evenly divided the top six paperback spots on The New York Times Best Seller list.

In reporting about the television series, Bill Keveney of USA Today said, "The book ends with him [Mitch McDeere] on the run, his law career apparently over; the movie ends with him and his wife, Abby, on their way back to Boston, hoping for a new start in life and law." Keveney said that the television show more closely resembles the film in this regard. Mike Hale of The New York Times, however, notes that conflict with the mob "...doesn’t jibe with the film, which ended with his having reached a détente with them while avoiding witness protection." He does note that "It takes a couple of jarring, revisionist flashbacks in the first 10 minutes of the premiere to reconcile these details."

The Firm marks the third television adaptation of a John Grisham novel.  The Client was a 1995 adaptation of the 1993 novel of the same name that aired 21 episodes on CBS between September 17, 1995, and April 16, 1996, during the 1995–96 United States television season.  Grisham was not credited for the development of that adaptation. The Street Lawyer was a 2003 adaptation of the 1998 novel of the same name that never aired on ABC that was developed for the 2003–04 United States television season. The novel Ford County was also in development as an NBC series at one time.

Episodes

Broadcast
In May 2011, it was announced that in the United States, The Firm would air during the 2011–12 network television season on Sundays at 10:00 pm. It was intended to premiere as a 2012 mid-season replacement following The Apprentice.  However, in November 2011, it was announced that in the United States, The Firm would air on Thursdays 10:00 pm. It premiered as a 2012 midseason replacement following Up All Night, taking over the time slot from Prime Suspect. It premiered with a two-hour special on Sunday January 8, 2012 before debuting in its regular one-hour time slot on January 12. The premiere drew NBC's worst ratings in the key advertising demographic ever for a regular season drama debut. On February 3, 2012, NBC announced that The Firm was being rescheduled to Saturdays at 9/8c, with its original Thursday 10/9c slot being taken by Awake.

In Canada, the show premiered on January 8 and was shown in simulcast with NBC for the first six episodes. With the acquisition of Awake, Shaw has moved The Firm to Saturdays at 10:00 pm on Global, beginning with "Chapter 10" on March 10, 2012. The Firm repeats on Showcase on Friday night, Saturday morning and night, as well as morning and night of the following Tuesday. The series is also shown Sundays on Mystery TV.

With its debut on February 19, The Firm marks the first time that AXN has premiered a show on the same day in all of its markets. The AXN broadcast broadens the shows markets to over 125 territories and countries across Africa, Asia, Latin America, Central Europe, Germany, Italy, Japan, Portugal, Russia, and Spain. Worldwide distribution is handled by Entertainment One, who owns the basic and pay television, broadcast television, and digital/DVD rights for the show outside of AXN markets.

On March 17, 2012, the show was pre-empted by the new NBC reality show Fashion Star for one week. On May 4, 2012 NBC announced on the show's Facebook page that they were delaying episode 16 until May 12 due to the holiday Cinco de Mayo. Episode 16 was broadcast in Canada on May 5, resulting in NBC being one week behind the Canadian broadcast.

In May 2012, it was confirmed that NBC would not be continuing with the show beyond the one season.

As of 2021, the series is currently being heavily promoted by Scottish Television (STV) for its STV Player service.

Ratings

Reception
The series received an approval rating of 39% on review aggregator Rotten Tomatoes, based on twenty three reviews, its consensus reads, "A typical, old-fashioned legal crime show, The Firm grows tedious from the first episode." 
 Prior to its initial airing, Entertainment Weekly critic Melissa Maerz gave the show a B rating, stating that "For a supposed update, The Firm sometimes feels like a relic from a bygone era." However, she notes that McDeere is "an old-school, self-made hero" that you can't help rooting for and that The Firm is a "straightforward, one-man-against-the-system story" of "the scrappy, Everyman lawyer fighting against Big Corruption" that is naturally compelling. The Hollywood Reporter Tim Goodman describes the show as "a solid if unspectacular story about one of the most unlucky lawyers ever depicted on television." and uses the phrase "Average . . . as a Television Series" in the review title. Los Angeles Times television critic Mary McNamara presents arguments that the show has low prospects for success: "It isn't the flashbacks or muddled storytelling, the liberal white moralizing or ridiculous inconsistencies that threaten to deep-six 'The Firm,' it's the washed-out sepia tone of the legal thriller itself." McNamara does not totally dismiss the possibility that Reiter, the man she says "all but invented the legal thriller derivative", may be able to mold this show into what she calls a "solid procedural hybrid", but questions the demand for such a show in the face of The Good Wife and Damages. Hale complains that the television show is not self-contained: "...if you haven’t seen the film (or read the John Grisham novel on which both are based), the TV show will be especially bewildering." He also complains that the weekly plot "...is notably slight and unbelievable, even for a TV legal drama.." While giving 1.5 out of 4 stars, Robert Bianco of the USA Today claims that the show "is part weekly procedural, part season-long conspiracy, and wholly unsatisfying" and notes that it would not let a chance to present a clichéd moment slip by.

While giving the show two stars, Gail Pennington of the St. Louis Post-Dispatch says "'The Firm' is tedious but not terrible; whether it will be watchable depends, one, on how much you like legal procedurals and, two, how the ongoing McDeeres-in-jeopardy plot is handled in future episodes." By way of comparison, she describes the show as "Harry's Law minus all charm" and as a show that "really wants to be Damages circa 2007". She also notes that because of the financing deal, the show is unlikely to be cancelled before the 22-episode run is completed.

Not all the reviews were negative. David Wiegand of the San Francisco Chronicle describes the show as "old-fashioned" in a good way. He speaks highly of things ranging from retro opening credits that he described as slick to the payphone that he mentions as if it is quaint. He also notes that the characters incorporate "nods to classic thrillers of the past" in a manner that is "in keeping with that old-fashioned element that wafts through the show". Wiegand considers the unusual 22-episode investment a safe one because "The cast is appealing and the story line is not only compelling but also deals with fascinating moral complexities."

Notes

External links

The Firm at Metacritic
The Firm at TV Guide
The Firm at Epguides
The Firm at TheFutonCritic.com

2012 American television series debuts
2012 American television series endings
2012 Canadian television series debuts
2012 Canadian television series endings
2010s American crime television series
2010s American legal television series
2010s American workplace drama television series
2010s Canadian crime television series
American sequel television series
English-language television shows
American legal drama television series
Crime thriller television series
Canadian legal television series
Canadian thriller television series
Global Television Network original programming
NBC original programming
Live action television shows based on films
Television series about families
Television shows based on American novels
Television series by Sony Pictures Television
Television series by Entertainment One
Television series by Corus Entertainment
Television shows filmed in Toronto
Television shows set in Washington, D.C.
Television series by Paramount Television